Bryan Glass may refer to:

 Bryan P. Glass (1919–2010), American mammalogist
 Bryan J. L. Glass, American comic book writer